Hyde Park Corner may refer to:
Hyde Park Corner, a landmark in London, United Kingdom
Hyde Park Corner tube station
Hyde Park Corner (film), a 1935 drama set in London
A junction on the corner of the Hyde Park area in Leeds
Hyde Park Corner (shopping centre), a shopping centre in Johannesburg, South Africa
Hyde Park Corner (Royal Berks) Commonwealth War Graves Commission Cemetery in Belgium
A secret code name given by the British government for the death and funeral arrangements of King George VI of the United Kingdom
"Hyde Park Corner", episode 2 of the first season of the Netflix series The Crown, which covers the death of King George VI